The 1995 Omloop Het Volk was the 49th edition of the Omloop Het Volk cycle race and was held on 25 February 1995. The race started and finished in Ghent. The race was won by Franco Ballerini.

General classification

References

1995
Omloop Het Nieuwsblad
Omloop Het Nieuwsblad
February 1995 sports events in Europe